Harper Brewer Jr. (born December 22, 1937), was an American politician in the state of Tennessee. Brewer served in the Tennessee House of Representatives as a Democrat from the 98th District from 1973 to 1987. A native of Memphis, Tennessee, he was an educator and alumnus of the Nashville School of Law and Fisk University.

References

1937 births
Living people
Tennessee Democrats
Politicians from Memphis, Tennessee
Nashville School of Law alumni
Fisk University alumni